Pada-Aruküla is a small village in Viru-Nigula Parish, Lääne-Viru County, in northeastern Estonia. It is located approximately 71 miles or 114 kilometres east of Tallinn. The village is close to the coast of the Gulf of Finland and a short drive away from Lake Peipus, which divides Estonia from Russia.

References

 

Villages in Lääne-Viru County